USS Extractor ARS-15 was an Anchor-class rescue and salvage ship of the United States Navy in World War II.

Extractor was launched by Colberg Boat Works, Stockton, California, on 15 June 1943 (sponsored by Mrs. Lowden Jessup), and commissioned on 3 March 1944.

Service history
Extractor sailed from San Francisco on 8 May 1944 en route to Eniwetok where she reported to Commander Service Squadron 2 (ServRon 2) for salvage and rescue duty. During the summer of 1944 she executed repairs, diving, and towing as well as salvage operations from Pearl Harbor to Eniwetok and Ulithi. On 20 November while at Ulithi she fought futilely against fire on board  which capsized and sank.

On 3 December 1944 she steamed to Guam, reporting for duty with Service Squadron 12 (ServRon 12), with which she served until 21 January 1945 when she departed unescorted for the Philippine area. Six people died and the remainder rescued by Guardfish''.

References

External links 
 navsource.org: USS Extractor
  hazegray.org: USS Extractor

 

Anchor-class rescue and salvage ships
World War II auxiliary ships of the United States
Friendly fire incidents of World War II
World War II shipwrecks in the Philippine Sea
Ships built in Stockton, California
1943 ships
Maritime incidents in January 1945
Ships sunk by American submarines